Anna Emily Nix (born 12 January 1998) is a German ice hockey player, currently playing in the German Women's Ice Hockey League (DFEL) with the Eisbären Juniors Berlin.

Nix represented  at the 2019 IIHF Women's World Championship. As a junior player with the German national under-18 ice hockey team, she participated in the Division I Group A tournaments of the IIHF Women's U18 World Championships in 2014, 2015, and 2016. At the 2015 tournament, she was named Germany's best player by the coaches. In 2016, Nix lead the tournament in assists (6), points (8), and plus–minus (+8), and was selected as Best Forward by the tournament directorate.

References

External links
 

1998 births
Living people
Expatriate ice hockey players in Sweden
German expatriate ice hockey people
German expatriate sportspeople in Sweden
German women's ice hockey forwards
HV71 Dam players
Sportspeople from Hamburg